Cardiac yoga is a system of stress management and health promotion designed specifically to focus on the needs of a heart patient.  Cardiac yoga is basically artery gentle yoga exercises tailored to the special needs of people who have various cardiac problems, live with a cardiac condition or recover from cardiac diseases. Cardiac yoga allows for the participant to stay seated while learning the different movements, and eventually working their way up to a full yoga routine.

Cardiac Yoga is listed as a trademark of founder and director, M. Mala Cunningham, Ph.D.

Among the cardiovascular problems that cardiac yoga is aimed to relieve are coronary artery disease, hypertension, myocardial infarction, bypass surgery, and many others.  Cardiac yoga is recommended to the medically stable patients.

Methods
Cardiac yoga focuses mainly on breathing practices, stress reduction, stretching, relaxation, and body awareness techniques.  While exercising, patients use mats, pillows, chairs and other accessories to ensure general comfort and correct positioning. The aim is to improve lung capacity, reduce stress, strengthen tired muscles and inspire healing. It also assists with emotional adjustment. 
A Yale University of Medicine study done in 2004 showed that patients who did yoga three times a week could lower their blood pressure and resting heart rate, which in turn can help to lower the risk of heart problems.

Clinical trials
In the Czech Republic, Dr Wolfgang Mayer-Berger conducted a study on male cardiac-rehab patients that had been previously diagnosed with hypertension. The participants took part in the three-week program, which consisted of half an hour of “cardiac yoga”, for five days per week.  The results showed declines in systolic blood pressure. The patients who participated in the “cardiac yoga” continued on with the exercises after the study was complete.

Cardiac yoga is aimed at helping cardiovascular patients to develop an exercise routine that can be done at home to further promote a healthy lifestyle.  Patients learn deep relaxation, stretching and breathing techniques, work with their imagination, and observe a healthy diet.  Cardiac yoga concentrates on positive attitude and aims to support the mind, spirit and body of cardiovascular patients.

Inspiration
The actual type of yoga that cardiac yoga can be connected with could be Hatha Yoga. It aims to achieve balance between the body and the mind, incorporating breathing exercises as well as meditation. It is often used for healing the body in a natural way, rather than using western medications. Hatha yoga uses physical poses called asanas, which would be modified slightly in cardiac yoga. The word asana is Sanskrit for “seat” which is what cardiac yoga focuses on with breathing techniques as well as flexibility and concentration on specific areas of the body.

An example of cardiac yoga would be doing the sun salutation pose while sitting on a chair. After improving strength the person may stop using the back of the chair to support themselves and eventually, by gaining confidence and strength they may be able to complete the exercise standing without support.

References

Yoga styles